Vladimir Putin's meeting table is a white-topped oval beech table that was installed in the Kremlin in the late 1990s, during the presidency of Boris Yeltsin. It is reported that the table is 6 metres (20 feet) long,  made from a single sheet of beech wood, and supported on three hollowed wooden stands. It is lacquered white and is gold-plated on the side.

OAK Furniture, a business from Cantù, Italy, claimed to make the table, as part of a deal furnishing parts of the Kremlin between 1995 and 1997. OAK has produced a picture of the table in a book published in 1999.

History
In 2022, Russian president Vladimir Putin has used the table in meetings with world leaders, among others Emmanuel Macron, Olaf Scholz and António Guterres. Putin was pictured seated at one end of a very long white meeting table, with the other participants seated far away from him at the other end. Putin has also been pictured attending similarly distanced meetings with his own officials at other long tables. The table became the subject of numerous internet memes.

It has been speculated that Putin chooses to use the long table in an attempt to intimidate and to project an image of power, or for fear of contracting COVID-19. Putin has been pictured attending meetings in close proximity with Chinese Communist Party general secretary Xi Jinping and Belarusian president Alexander Lukashenko in the same period.

See also  
 Public image of Vladimir Putin
 Eglantine Table
 Sea Dog Table
 Presidential desks:
 C&O desk, Hoover desk, Johnson desk, Resolute desk, Theodore Roosevelt desk, Wilson desk

References

External links

Individual pieces of furniture
Tables (furniture)
Internet memes related to the 2022 Russian invasion of Ukraine
Moscow Kremlin
Meeting table